Lasioglossum lativentre  is a Palearctic species of sweat bee.

References

External links
Images representing  Lasioglossum lativentre 

Hymenoptera of Europe
lativentre
Insects described in 1853